The Fujifilm FinePix HS is a series of bridge cameras that started in February 2010 with the HS10 model (also called HS11). The special feature of the HS cameras is the manual zoom that - otherwise common only with system cameras - allows a quick and precise change of the focal length but demands two-handed operation.

Common features 
All Fuji HS models have these properties in common:
 CMOS back-lit sensor, EXR from HS20 on
 Raw file format
 Electronic viewfinder (resolution 200k at first, later 900k pixels)
 3" tiltable LCD screen (tilt and swivel for HS50)
 Maximum ISO setting of 12,800
 High-definition video

Generations and models

HS10

The first model in this series features a 10.3 megapixel sensor and 24–720 mm equivalent focal length lens at a maximum aperture of f/2.8 to f/5.6. It is the only model in the series so far to not have an EXR colour filter.

HS20 

The HS10's 10 Mpix sensor was upgraded to a 16 Mpix EXR sensor and a higher resolution screen - 460k compared to 230k - in January 2011 in the HS20 model.

HS25, HS30, HS33, HS35 

The FinePix HS30EXR was introduced in January 2012 as the third model in the HS range.
The HS30 and HS25 feature a redesigned 16MP back-lit CMOS sensor and gain a series of improvements over the previous HS20 model, such as manual focusing during video capture and more scene modes.

The HS25EXR is identical to the HS30EXR except that it does not offer RAW support and uses AA / NiMh batteries compared to the Lithium battery of the HS30. HS25 has lower resolution electronic viewfinder.

The HS35 was announced in 2013, together with the HS50. The HS35 is cheaper model of HS30 with almost identical features and appearance as the HS30. The different are, the HS35 can take ISO 6400 and 12800 without boost, but lack of flash modes (no Auto, On, Off, Red-eye, Slow Sync), lack of White balance presets, and no charger.

HS50, HS55 

The current (2013) HS50 model represents the fourth generation. Added features are a new EXR CMOS II sensor, a faster hybrid contrast-and-phase-detection autofocus, faster video (HD 60p) and burst speeds and a new 24–1000 mm equivalent zoom with lens-shift stabilizer. The screen now has 920k resolution and is variable-angle.

Photographic functions comprise:
 PASM and custom exposure modes
 EXR mode (dynamic range/high resolution)
 Face Detection, Auto Red-eye removal
 Advanced modes: Pro focus, Pro low light, Multiple exposure
 Motion Panorama 360, Film simulation
 Advanced filter: Toy Camera / Miniature / POP COLOR / High-Key / Low-Key / Dynamic Tone / Partial Color / Soft Focus
Video:
 Resolution HD 1920 x 1080 or 1280 x 720 pixels at 60 frames/s, or VGA
 High Speed Movie (120 / 240 / 480 frames/sec.)
 Microphone-level adjustment, external microphone input
Supportive functions:
 Electronic level, Histogram display
 Focus check, Focus peaking in Manual focus mode
 Framing guideline, best frame capture

See also 
 Fujifilm FinePix
 Fujifilm cameras
 Fujifilm

References

HS30EXR